The Abeille Liberté is an emergency tow vessel (salvage tug) based in Cherbourg Harbour, France. It is a sister ship of Abeille Bourbon.

It was built at the Myklebust Verft shipyard in Gursken, Norway, which is part of the Kleven Maritime group. It was delivered in October 2005 and officially inaugurated on 17 November 2005.

Abeille Liberté is owned by Abeilles International, a unit of Groupe Bourbon. The crew is made up of sailors of the merchant marine. It is chartered to the French government and can be called upon by the Maritime Prefect of the English Channel and North Sea at any time.

Notable operations 
It was one of two French tugs called upon to tow the damaged container ship MSC Napoli in January 2007.

In March 2018 the Abeille Liberté was one of several vessels which towed the cargo ship Britannica Hav to the Port of Le Havre after it collided with a Belgian fishing vessel.

References

External links 
  Abeille Liberté at Netmarine.net

Tugboats of France
2005 ships
Ships built in Norway